Jordan Christopher McCrary (born July 28, 1993) is an American soccer player who plays as a defender.

Career

College and amateur
McCrary played four years of college soccer at the University of North Carolina at Chapel Hill between 2011 and 2015, including a red-shirted year in 2014 due to a torn ACL. While at college, McCrary appeared for Premier Development League side Reading United A.C. in 2011 and fellow Premier Development League side Carolina Dynamo in 2014 and 2015.

Professional
On January 14, 2016, McCrary was drafted 10th overall in the 2016 MLS SuperDraft by New England Revolution. McCrary made his professional debut while on loan to New England's United Soccer League affiliate Rochester Rhinos, appearing in a 0-1 loss to Richmond Kickers on April 9, 2016.

McCrary was released by New England at the end of their 2016 season.
On March 9, 2017, McCrary signed with USL side Toronto FC II. On February 13, 2018, McCrary signed with MLS club Seattle Sounders FC.

On February 26, 2019, McCrary was released by Seattle ahead of their 2019 season.

On March 22, 2019, McCrary joined USL Championship side Sacramento Republic FC. On November 17, 2020, Sacramento exercised the option on McCrary's contract, retaining him for the 2021 season. McCrary was released by Sacramento following the 2021 season.

References

External links

1993 births
Living people
African-American soccer players
American soccer players
Association football defenders
North Carolina Fusion U23 players
Major League Soccer players
New England Revolution draft picks
New England Revolution players
North Carolina Tar Heels men's soccer players
Reading United A.C. players
Rochester New York FC players
Sacramento Republic FC players
Seattle Sounders FC players
Tacoma Defiance players
Soccer players from Georgia (U.S. state)
Sportspeople from Marietta, Georgia
Toronto FC II players
USL Championship players
USL League Two players
21st-century African-American sportspeople